The 1964 Sam Houston State Bearkats football team was an American football team that represented Sam Houston State University as a member of the Lone Star Conference (LSC) during the 1964 NAIA football season. In their 13th year under head coach Paul Pierce, the Bearkats compiled a 9–1–1 record (5–1 against conference opponents), won the Lone Star Conference championship, and tied Concordia (Minnesota) in the Champion Bowl to share the NAIA national championship.

Seven Sam Houston State players received first-team honors on the 1964 All-Lone Star Conference football team selected by the conference coaches: halfback Billy Arlen; offensive guard Keith Collins; center Don Murray; defensive tackle Frank Fox; defensive guard Benny Sorgee; linebacker David Martin; and defensive halfback Edward Bittick.

The team played its home games at Pritchett Field in Huntsville, Texas.

Schedule

References

Sam Houston State
Sam Houston Bearkats football seasons
NAIA Football National Champions
Lone Star Conference football champion seasons
Sam Houston State Bearkats football